Harald Stein (born 4 August 1942) is a German former sailor who competed in the 1968 Summer Olympics.

Since 1970, Stein is physician and works as a pathologist in Berlin, Germany.

References

External links
 

1942 births
Living people
German male sailors (sport)
German pathologists
Olympic sailors of West Germany
Sailors at the 1968 Summer Olympics – 5.5 Metre
Physicians of the Charité